Phillips, Craig and Dean is Phillips, Craig and Dean's self-titled debut album, released on September 17, 1992. The songs "Turn Up the Radio" and "Favorite Song of All" were released as singles. Both of those songs, as well as "Midnight Oil", "This Is the Life" and "Little Bit of Morning", were included on their greatest hits album Favorite Songs of All.

Track listing

Personnel 
Phillips, Craig & Dean
 Randy Phillips – lead vocals (6, 7, 9, 10), backing vocals
 Shawn Craig – lead vocals (2, 3, 5, 6), backing vocals
 Dan Dean – lead vocals (1, 4, 5, 6, 8), backing vocals

Musicians
 Paul Mills – keyboards, bass programming, additional drums and percussion programming (1, 3); additional keyboards, bass and percussion programming (2, 4–10)
 Brian Green – keyboards and bass programming (2, 4–10)
 Jerry McPherson – acoustic and electric guitars
 Michael Hodge – acoustic guitar (10)
 Mark Hammond – drums and percussion programming
 Sam Levine – saxophones (1)
 Marty Paoletta – saxophone (10)
 Chris McDonald – trombone (1), brass arrangements (1)
 Mike Haynes – trumpet (1)
 George Tidwell – trumpet (1)
 Chris Rodriguez – backing vocals
 Guy Penrod – backing vocals (1, 3)
 Chris Eaton – backing vocals (2, 4–10)
 Gail Mayes – backing vocals (6)

Production 
 Executive Producer – Jackie Patillo
 Producer, Engineer and Mixing – Paul Mills
 Recorded and Mixed at RTC Studios (Nashville, TN).
 Brass Engineering on track 1 – Steve Dady at Skylab Studios (Nashville, TN).
 Mastered by Hank Williams at MasterMix (Nashville, TN).
 Production Management – Chad Williams and Scott Brickell at Chapel Hill Management.
 Creative Direction – Toni Thigpen
 Design and Layout – YNO Design
 Photography – Russ Harrington

References

1992 debut albums
Phillips, Craig and Dean albums